Augusta Xu-Holland (born 17 April 1991) is a New Zealand actress.

Early life and education
Xu-Holland was born in Auckland to a Chinese father and New Zealand mother and grew up in Wellington and the Bay of Plenty. From 2009 to 2013, she attended Victoria University for a bachelor's degree in biology and Asian studies. Upon graduation, she moved to China and worked in public relations and bioenergy at Kaidi New Energy Group, China's largest privately owned bioenergy company.

Shortly after deciding to become an actress in 2015, Xu-Holland was cast in a leading role in The Last Race alongside award-winning actors Joseph Fiennes and Shawn Dou.

Career

China
Xu-Holland started her acting career in China-Hollywood co-production The Last Race (2016) directed by Stephen Shin. The Last Race is an unofficial sequel to the Academy Award winning story of Chinese-born Scottish Olympic gold medalist Eric Liddell, Chariots of Fire (1981). In The Last Race, Xu-Holland plays Catherine Standish, a fictional character whom Eric Liddell, played by Joseph Fiennes, gave up his chance of repatriation arranged between the British Prime Minister, Winston Churchill, and the Japanese government. Liddell later died in the Weixian Internment Camp in Weifang, China.

Xu-Holland is best recognized for her work in China, such as television series “Borderland Love” (2018) written by award-winning Chinese Gao Mantang and online film Special Mission (2018). In 2019, Xu-Holland stars in one of China's most highly anticipated films The Eight Hundred (2019) directed by Guan Hu, alongside Li Chen and Yao Chen.

Global
The US version of The Last Race was released under the title On Wings of Eagles in 2017. Unspoken Code (2018) won Best Narrative Short at the California International Shorts Festival and Best Short Film at the Female Eye Film Festival in Toronto.

Xu-Holland has never received formal acting training, and attributes her skills to the scale of opportunities whilst working in China.

Filmography

Film

Television Series

References

External links
 Official website of Augusta Xu-Holland
 

1991 births
Living people
New Zealand actresses
Victoria University of Wellington alumni
People from Auckland